The 2013 UEFA European Under-17 Championship was the twelfth edition of UEFA's European Under-17 Football Championship since the re-organising of age group competitions in 2002. Slovakia were hosts of the tournament with games taking place at four venues between 5–17 May.

This competition also acted as a qualifier for the 2013 FIFA U-17 World Cup, as 6 teams qualified.

Players born after 1 January 1996 were eligible to participate in this competition. The Netherlands were the titleholder, but failed to make it past the elite round qualification process, along with every team that played in the 2012 final round.

Venues

Štadión pod Dubňom, Žilina (capacity 10,831)
Mestský Štadión, Dubnica nad Váhom (5,156)
Štadión pod Zoborom, Nitra (5,050)
Štadión FC ViOn, Zlaté Moravce (3,300)

Qualification

The final tournament of the 2013 UEFA European Under-17 Championship was preceded by two qualification stages: a qualifying round and an Elite round. During the rounds, 52 national teams competed to determine the seven teams that would progress to the finals.

The first round was played from 24 September to 14 November 2012, with 28 of those advancing to the elite round. The elite rounds were played during March 2013.

Qualified countries

1 Bold indicates champion for that year. Italic indicates host for that year.

Squads

Match officials

Referees
  Neil Doyle (Republic of Ireland)
  Nerijus Dunauskas (Lithuania)
  Serdar Gözübüyük (Netherlands)
  Anastasios Sidiropoulos (Greece)
  Ivaylo Stoyanov (Bulgaria)
  Slavko Vinčić (Slovenia)

Assistant referees
  Gregory Crotteux (Belgium)
  Silver Kõiv (Estonia)
  Dejan Kostadinov (Macedonia)
  Milan Minić (Serbia)
  Birkir Sigurdarson (Iceland)
  Richard Storey (Northern Ireland)
  Dmitri Zhuk (Belarus)
  Sergei Vassyutin (Kazakhstan)

Fourth officials
  Petr Kráľovič (Slovakia)
  Vladimír Vnuk (Slovakia)

Group stage

Group A

Group B

Knockout stage

Bracket

Semi-finals

Final

Goalscorers
2 goals

  Elio Capradossi
  Mario Pugliese
  Martin Slaninka
  Robin Kamber

1 goal

  Dominik Baumgartner
  Daniel Ripic
  Nikola Zivotic
  Alen Halilović
  Robert Murić
  Vittorio Parigini
  Aleksei Gasilin
  Dzhamaldin Khodzhaniyazov
  Maksim Mayrovich
  Rifat Zhemaletdinov
  Atila Varga
  Gustav Engvall
  Ali Suljić
  Marco Trachsel
  Viktor Tsygankov
  Beka Vachiberadze

Broadcasting
Live coverage and highlights of the finals were broadcast by Eurosport throughout Europe.

References

External links
 Official website

 
2012–13 in European football
2013
2013 UEFA European Under-17 Championship
2013 in Slovak sport

2012–13 in Slovak football
May 2013 sports events in Europe
2013 in youth association football